The Karnataka State Pollution Control Board (KSPCB) is a legal entity entrusted for control of pollution in the Indian State of Karnataka. The Board regulates air, water and environmental pollution.

History
The Board was originally constituted as the Karnataka State Pollution Control Board for Prevention and Control of Water Pollution in 1974 as per section 4 of the Water (Prevention and Control of Pollution) Act, 1974. It was renamed the Karnataka State Pollution Control Board in 1985 after the enactment of Air (Prevention & Control of Pollution) Act in 1981. The Board was initially mandated only to implement the Water Act. Subsequently, it was empowered to enforce to enforce the Water (Prevention & Control of Pollution) Cess Act, 1977; the  Water (Prevention & Control of Pollution) Cess Rules, 1978; and a series of Rules and Notifications framed under the Environment Protection Act, 1986.

Structure
The headquarters of the KSPCB is located in Bangalore. The KSPCB also has 44 regional offices, with at least one office in each district of Karnataka.

See also
 Environmental issues in India

References

External links
 

State agencies of Karnataka
State pollution control boards of India
Environment of Karnataka
1974 establishments in Karnataka
Government agencies established in 1974